1851 Naval Air Squadron (1851 NAS) was a Naval Air Squadron of the Royal Navy's Fleet Air Arm.

Notes

References

External links
 

1800 series Fleet Air Arm squadrons
Military units and formations established in 1944